Khwunrghunme (also, Kal-a-qu-ni-me-ne-tunne, Kal-hwun-un-me-e-nite-ne, and Qwun-rxun-me) is a former Yurok settlement in Del Norte County, California, south of the mouth of Klamath River. It lay at an elevation of 33 feet (10 m).

References

External links

Yurok villages
Former settlements in Del Norte County, California
Former Native American populated places in California